Marut Bunnag (21 August 1924 – 23 September 2022) was a Thai politician. A member of the Democrat Party, he served as Speaker of the House of Representatives from 1992 to 1995.

Bunnag died in Bangkok on 23 September 2022, at the age of 98.

References

1924 births
2022 deaths
Marut Bunnag
Marut Bunnag
Marut Bunnag
Marut Bunnag
Marut Bunnag
Marut Bunnag
Marut Bunnag
Marut Bunnag
Marut Bunnag